Alexei Andreyevich Polivanov (March 16, 1855 – September 25, 1920) was a Russian military figure, infantry general (1915).  He served as Russia's Minister of War from June 1915 until the Tsarina Alexandra forced his removal from office in March 1916.

Biography
Polivanov was born to an aristocratic family. He graduated from the Nikolaevsky Military Engineering Academy in Petersburg, present-day Saint Petersburg Military Engineering-Technical University (Nikolaevsky), from which he graduated in 1880. He served in the 1877–78 Russo-Turkish War. He later became a member of the Russian General Staff (1899–1904), rising in 1905 to become its chief the following year.

Following the disastrous defeat in the 1904–1905 Russo-Japanese War, he was appointed assistant Minister of War and quickly recommended extensive political and military reforms. However, he was dismissed in 1912 because of his cooperation with liberal factions within the Duma.

Polivanov was appointed to the State Council in 1912 and served until June 1915 when he replaced Vladimir Sukhomlinov as Minister of War; and at once started transforming the Russian army's training system and tried with limited success to improve its supply and communications systems.

However, in August 1915 he became aware of Tsar Nicholas II's plan to replace Grand Duke Nikolai as commander-in-chief of the army and personally lead the Russian armies at the front, and made strenuous efforts to persuade him not to.

This helped alienate Polivanov from the Tsarina, who then conspired to have him sacked, and achieved this when Tsar Nicholas dismissed him in March 1916. He was succeeded by Dmitry Shuvayev.

Following the Russian Revolution, Polivanov joined the Red Army in February 1920, participating in the Soviet-Polish peace talks in Riga later that year but died of typhus during the talks.

He was awarded Order of Prince Danilo I and other decorations.

References

External links 
 
 

1855 births
1920 deaths
Military Engineering-Technical University alumni
Imperial Russian Army generals
Politicians of the Russian Empire
Russian military personnel of World War I
Deaths from typhus
Soviet Army officers
Burials at Nikolskoe Cemetery